Dendrobium devonianum (Devon's dendrobium) is a species of orchid. It is native to southern China (Guangxi, Guizhou, Tibet, Yunnan), the eastern Himalayas (Bhutan, Assam), and northern Indochina (Myanmar, Thailand, Laos, Vietnam). It is an epiphyte that grows on tree trunks in mountain forests.

References

devonianum
Flora of the Indian subcontinent
Flora of Indo-China
Flora of Tibet
Plants described in 1840